Bribe Payers Index (BPI) is a measure of how willing a nation's multinational corporations appear to engage in corrupt business practices. The first BPI was published by Transparency International on October 26, 1999 and the last one in 2011. Spokesperson Shubham Kaushik said the organization "decided to discontinue the survey due to funding issues and to focus on issues that are more in line with our advocacy goals".

The BPI 2011

Methodology
The BPI 2011 ranked 28 of the leading exporting countries on the likelihood their multinational businesses will use bribes when operating abroad. The ranking is calculated from responses by businesses to two questions on the World Economic Forum’s Executive Opinion Survey.

The first question asks for the country of origin of foreign-owned companies doing the most business in their country. The second question is: "In  your  experience,  to  what  extent  do  firms  from  the  countries  you  have  selected  make undocumented extra payments or bribes?" Answers are to be given on a scale of 1 (bribes are common or even mandatory) to 10 (bribes are unknown).

The BPI ranking is the averaged score, with higher scores suggesting a lower likelihood of using bribery.

These countries were selected as the leading international or regional exporting countries. Their combined global exports represented 75 percent of the world total in 2006. Countries that had paid the less bribes have a higher BPI.

BPI 2011 rankings

See also
 Corruption Perceptions Index
 Foreign Corrupt Practices Act
 Global Corruption Barometer
 OECD Anti-Bribery Convention
 Transparency International
 United Nations Convention against Corruption

Footnotes

Sources
 Bribe Payers Index (BPI) 2006 Analysis Report

Bribery
Lists by country

lt: Kyšininkavimo užsienyje indeksas